Kareemabad is a part of Warangal Tri-city or Warangal City in the Indian state of Telangana. It is located amidst Kazipet and Warangal.

References

Hanamkonda district